Robert P. Lipton is the Nicholson Professor of Mathematics in the Department of Mathematics at Louisiana State University. He is known for his research on Mathematics of Materials science.

Academic Biography
Lipton obtained his PhD in Mathematics at Courant Institute of Mathematical Sciences in 1986, as a student of Robert V. Kohn.  He was a Postdoctoral Associate and Visiting Assistant Professor in the Mathematical Sciences Institute at Cornell University and a C. B. Morrey Assistant Professor in the Department of Mathematics at University of California, Berkeley

Honors

He is a fellow of the American Mathematical Society., a fellow of the Society for Industrial and Applied Mathematics, and a fellow of the American Association for the Advancement of Science

References

External links 
Robert P. Lipton website

Year of birth missing (living people)
Living people
20th-century American mathematicians
21st-century American mathematicians
New York University alumni
University of California, Berkeley faculty
Louisiana State University faculty
Fellows of the American Mathematical Society
Fellows of the Society for Industrial and Applied Mathematics
Fellows of the American Association for the Advancement of Science